Thiruvalla State assembly constituency is one of the 140 state legislative assembly constituencies at the state Kerala in southern India. It is also one of the 7 state legislative assembly constituencies included in the Pathanamthitta Lok Sabha constituency. The current MLA is Mathew T. Thomas of JD(S).

Local self governed segments
Thiruvalla Niyamasabha constituency is composed of the following local self governed segments:

Members of Legislative Assembly 
The following list contains all members of Kerala legislative assembly who have represented the constituency:

Key

 

* indicates bypolls

Election results 
Percentage change (±%) denotes the change in the number of votes from the immediate previous election.

Niyamasabha Election 2016 
There were 2,08,798 registered voters in the constituency for the 2016 Kerala Niyamasabha Election.

Niyamasabha Election 2011 
There were 1,93,874 registered voters in the constituency for the 2011 election.

See also
 Thiruvalla
 Pathanamthitta district
 List of constituencies of the Kerala Legislative Assembly
 2016 Kerala Legislative Assembly election

References 

Assembly constituencies of Kerala
State assembly constituencies in Pathanamthitta district